Thierno Thioub (born 1 June 1998) is a Senegalese professional footballer who plays as a forward.

Club career
Thioub became second best scorer in the 2017–18 Senegal Premier League with 15 goals for Stade de Mbour.

On 23 August 2018, he signed with the Russian Premier League club FC Spartak Moscow.

He made his debut in the Russian Football National League for FC Spartak-2 Moscow on 26 August 2018 in a game against Zenit-2 Saint Petersburg and scored a last-minute goal after coming on as a substitute in the second half.

References

External links
 
 Profile by Russian Football National League

Living people
1998 births
People from Thiès Region
Senegalese footballers
Association football forwards
Stade de Mbour players
FC Spartak-2 Moscow players
Pau FC players
Russian First League players
Ligue 2 players
Senegalese expatriate footballers
Expatriate footballers in Russia
Senegalese expatriate sportspeople in Russia
Expatriate footballers in France
Senegalese expatriate sportspeople in France